Victoria Haven (born 1964 in Seattle) is an American artist known for her investigative drawing practices which often operate in the spaces between two and three dimensions. Using materials as varied as tape, rubber-bands, Gore-Tex, forged steel, and excavated building components, her work traces the corridors of real and imagined space. Critics say her "geometric abstractions...draw connections between landscape, history, and lived experience" with her work Blue Sun echoing the "weight and volume [of] the Olympic Mountain range" of Washington State. The artist says Blue Sun was inspired by time-lapse video of demolition and reconstruction in Seattle's South Lake Union neighborhood.

Career
Haven's art has been shown at the Frye Art Museum, Howard House, and Greg Kucera Gallery in Seattle, Washington. Her works have also been featured in group exhibitions at the Metropolitan Museum of Art in New York and at Lisson Gallery in London.

Recognition
Haven won two fellowships supported by the Pollock-Krasner Foundation (1996 and 2000) and received The Strangers Genius Award in 2004.

Recent exhibitions

2017 

 Angle, Pitch @ Outside, MA. Curated by Amie Cunat

2016 

 Metropolitan Museum of Art: Drawings and Prints; Selections from the Met Collection
 Blue Sun, Commissioned wall drawing for Olympic Sculpture Park, Seattle, WA
 Line, Lisson Gallery, London. Curated by Drawing Room, UK
 Contemporary Northwest Art Award Exhibition, Portland Art Museum

References

External links

1964 births
Alumni of the University of London
Artists from Seattle
Living people
University of Washington alumni
21st-century American artists
21st-century American women artists